Aylmer Hall was the pen name of Norah Eleanor Lyle Cummins (born 24 April 1914). She was the author of adventure stories for children written in the 1950s and 1960s. Her book The Tyrant King - A London Adventure was published by London Transport in 1967 with illustrations by Peter Roberson. The book inspired the TV series of the same name, directed by Mike Hodges.

Biography 
Hall was educated at St. Hugh's College, Oxford University where she earned a B.A. Honours in modern languages in 1935. She worked as an assistant secretary in 1936, and then went on to become a librarian at the Royal Institute of International Affairs from 1937 to 1939. From 1939 to 1940, she worked as a press librarian in the Ministry of Information. Hall was married to Robert Aylmer Hall on 8 October 1938. In addition to being a writer, Hall was also a historian.

Work 
The Daily Herald in Chicago wrote that The Search for Lancelot's Sword (1960) is a "well told mystery story." Kirkus Reviews wrote that her book about 1765 Ireland, Beware of Moonlight (1970) to have stereotyped characters and was "rambling, complicated and filled with hackneyed class-conscious poses." Myles McDowell puts many of Hall's books into the "Boys' Own" era, and writes that these can seem dated to modern readers.

Works
Hall wrote ten books, most of them historical adventures, though some had contemporary settings.
 The Mystery of Torland Manor (1952)
 The Admiral's Secret (1953)
 The K.F. Conspiracy (1955)
 The Sword of Glendower (1960) or The Search for Lancelot's Sword
 The Devilish Plot (1965)
 The Marked Man (1967)
 The Tyrant King (1967)
 Colonel Bull's Inheritance (1968)
 Beware of Moonlight (1969 or 70)
 The Minstrel Boy (1970)

References

External links

British children's writers
Alumni of the University of Oxford
British women short story writers
British librarians
British women historians
1914 births
1987 deaths